The Strathclyde Telegraph is a student newspaper which was founded in 1960 and is edited, written and produced by students at the University of Strathclyde. It is the University of Strathclyde’s only printed student newspaper and is produced on campus by students from start to finish. It aims to report on the activities of Union groups and elected officers and in so doing inform Strathclyde students about their Union as well as a variety of features and content relating to culture and the arts.

There are eight editions of the newspaper published per year - a new edition is published each month of the academic year (from September until April), including a special Freshers' edition published in September.

Support and resources 
Strathclyde Telegraph is provided financial support by the University of Strathclyde Alumni Fund and by the University of Strathclyde Students' Association. Money is also generated through advertising revenue.

Volunteering opportunities 
Strathclyde Telegraph is written, edited, produced and distributed by a team of student volunteers. Volunteers can contribute pieces as a writer and may become a member of the editorial team. They may also attend section meetings, assist in corresponding with editors and help distribute the paper to stands on campus.

The editorial team consists of: editor-in-chief, layout & social media editor, news editor, features editor, culture editor, music editor and sports editor. Any Strathclyde student may volunteer to join as a writer or editor regardless of whether they study in the area of journalism. The newspaper also functions as a university society and as such is not exclusive to students of journalism.

Distribution 

Students are able to obtain a copy of the newspaper at the following locations across campus:

•	The Union – front entrance, The Scene (level 4) and level 7 
•	Library – entrance of cafe 
•	James Weir Building – next to lifts on ground floor 
•	McCance – at the stairs on the ground floor and the cafe on the top floor 
•	Livingston Tower – cafe and lifts on the ground floor 
•	Java Cafe 
•	Biomedical Science building – ground floor study area

Print copies are also stocked at Glasgow Film Theatre.

Awards 
The Strathclyde Telegraph received a series of awards most recently in 2011 at the Scottish Student Press Awards run by The Herald newspaper. This was the 15th year of the awards, with Herald deputy editor, Magnus Llewellin the chair of the judging panel. Former writer for the Strathclyde Telegraph, Alan Robertson, was named as both News Writer of the Year and Student Journalist of the Year. Winners of seven of the nine categories were entitled to a one-week internship with The Herald; with the winner of the Student Journalist of the Year category entitled to a four-week internship. 
The newspaper itself came top of the Best Newspaper category where it was competing alongside other student publications The Saint (St Andrews University) and The Student (Edinburgh University).

At the 2019 Scottish Student Journalism Awards, the newspaper's website was awarded Website of the Year, while editor Steven Mair was commended for the Gender Equal Media Scotland Award.

References

External links 
 
 University Of Strathclyde Official Website

University of Strathclyde
Free newspapers
Monthly newspapers
Newspapers published in Scotland
Student newspapers published in the United Kingdom